David Underhill may refer to:

David Harris Underhill, American librarian and author
David Underhill, character in The Big Bang Theory (TV series)